The 1975–76 season was the 67th year of football played by Dundee United, and covers the period from 1 July 1975 to 30 June 1976. United finished in eighth place in the new Premier Division escaping relegation to the First Division.

Match results
Dundee United played a total of 49 competitive matches during the 1975–76 season.

Legend

All results are written with Dundee United's score first.
Own goals in italics

Premier Division

Scottish Cup

League Cup

UEFA Cup

League table

References

See also
 1975–76 in Scottish football

Dundee United F.C. seasons
Dundee United